Olivibacter oleidegradans is a Gram-negative, obligately aerobic, non-spore-forming, rod-shaped and non-motile bacterium from the genus of Olivibacter which has been isolated from a biofilter in Hungary. Olivibacter oleidegradans has the ability to degrade hydrocarbon.

References

Sphingobacteriia
Bacteria described in 2011